William Martin (born August 16, 1962) is an American former professional basketball player. He was a 6'7" (201 cm) 205 lb (93 kg) forward and played collegiately at Georgetown University from 1981–85.

Martin was selected with the 2nd pick of the second round in the 1985 NBA Draft by the Indiana Pacers. He played 66 games for them in 1985-86, averaging 5.0 points, 1.9 rebounds and 0.8 assists per game. In his second and third seasons he played with the New York Knicks and Phoenix Suns, respectively.
He was married to Janice Jackson and had a son, Christopher Martin who played at St. Patrick’s and later played at Marshall University. Christopher transferred to Mount Saint Mary’s.  He finished his collegiate career at Savannah State University. Chris has his own business, CMartyfit.  Bill  married Jacki Carter in 2002 and had a daughter.

External links
NBA stats @ basketballreference.com

1962 births
Living people
African-American basketball players
American expatriate basketball people in Italy
American men's basketball players
Basketball players from Washington, D.C.
Cincinnati Slammers players
Columbus Horizon players
Georgetown Hoyas men's basketball players
Indiana Pacers draft picks
Indiana Pacers players
La Crosse Catbirds players
New York Knicks players
Parade High School All-Americans (boys' basketball)
Phoenix Suns players
Rockford Lightning players
Small forwards
21st-century African-American people
20th-century African-American sportspeople